The 1975–76 Football League Cup was the 16th season of the Football League Cup, a knockout competition for England's top 92 football clubs. The tournament started on 18 August 1975 and ended with the final at Wembley on 28 February 1976.
This was the first season in which the First Round was played over two legs.
Manchester City won the tournament after defeating Newcastle United in the final at Wembley Stadium, London.

First round

First Leg

Second Leg

Replays

Second round

Ties

Replays

2nd Replays

Third round

Ties

Replays

Fourth round

Ties

Replays

Fifth Round

Ties

Semi-finals

First Leg

Second Leg

Final

The final was held at Wembley Stadium, London on 27 February 1976.

References

General

Specific

1974-75
1975–76 domestic association football cups
Lea
Cup